Frank W. Warner (1861–1919) was one of the first Native Americans to serve as a missionary for the Church of Jesus Christ of Latter-day Saints.

Warner was the son of Sagwitch and his wife Tan-tapai-cci.  He was originally known as Pisappih Timbimboo.  He was wounded at the Bear River Massacre.  Later he was adopted by Amos Warner and his family and was given his new name.

Warner studied at Brigham Young College in Logan, Utah.  He worked as an educator.  He was first called as a missionary in October 1880 by John Taylor to share the teachings of Mormonism with those in Washakie, Utah. In 1914–1915 and again in 1917 Warner served as a missionary among the Sioux and Assiniboine at the Fort Peck Indian Reservation.  He died from influenza in 1919 at Parker, Idaho.

References
 Garr et al., Encyclopedia of Latter-day Saint History. (Salt Lake City: Deseret Book, 2000) p. 1311
 

1861 births
1919 deaths
20th-century Mormon missionaries
American Latter Day Saints
American Mormon missionaries in the United States
Brigham Young College alumni
Deaths from Spanish flu
Infectious disease deaths in Idaho
Mormonism and Native Americans
Shoshone people
20th-century Native Americans
19th-century Native Americans